The Division 2 season 2000/2001, organised by the LFP was won by FC Sochaux-Montbéliard and saw the promotions of FC Sochaux-Montbéliard, FC Lorient and Montpellier HSC, whereas AS Cannes and Angers SCO were relegated to National.

20 participating teams

 Ajaccio
 Angers
 Beauvais
 Caen
 Cannes
 Châteauroux
 Créteil
 Gueugnon
 Laval
 Le Havre
 Le Mans
 Lorient
 Martigues
 Montpellier
 Nancy
 Nice
 Nîmes
 Niort
 Sochaux
 Wasquehal

League table

Recap
 Promoted to L1 : FC Sochaux-Montbéliard, FC Lorient, Montpellier HSC 
 Relegated to L2 : RC Strasbourg, AS Saint-Étienne
 Promoted to L2 : Grenoble Foot 38, Amiens SC, FC Istres
 Relegated to National : AS Cannes, Angers SCO (FC Martigues were not relegated since Toulouse FC were relegated from Division 1 to National)

Results

Top goalscorers

External links
RSSSF archives of results

Ligue 2 seasons
French
2000–01 in French football